Gold Star Records is an American independent record label, which was founded in  1941.

Gold Star Recording Company and Gold Star Sound Services

Gold Star Recording Company originated as a recording studio in Houston, Texas, and was founded in October 1941 by Bill Quinn under the name Quinn Recording Company. In 1950, Quinn changed the name of the studio to Gold Star Studios and, as such, remains the oldest registered recording studio in the Southeastern United States.

The studio was important in launching the careers of such artists as Lightnin' Hopkins, Harry Choates, George Jones, The Big Bopper, Eddie Noack, The Sir Douglas Quintet, Roy Head, and Freddy Fender. At that time, the operation was renowned for inventive recording equipment and  its reverberation chamber room.

Quinn would also release several Cajun songs on his Opera label.

Bill Quinn and Gold Star Studios
Gold Star Records featured blues, country music, (then still commonly known as hillbilly music) and cajun music. In his first few years of business, Bill Quinn also recorded radio commercials and added a novelty offering recorded birthday greetings.

The most significant change was the release of its first hit record, "Jole Blon" by Harry Choates, a swing and dance tune that and became the first and only Cajun record to reach the Billboard Top Five. His local pressing plant could not keep up and he authorized other independent labels to produce copies of this record across the country, such as Modern Records (#20-511), Starday(#187), D Records (#1024) and the Deluxe label.  Lightnin' Hopkins' "T-Model Blues" and "Tim Moore's Farm", both became top 10 national hits in 1948, helping to provide Gold Star with a string of hits throughout the late-1940s, 1950s and 1960s.

George Jones' first hit with them was "Why Baby Why" in 1955. Six more Jones hit singles ensued such as, "What Am I Worth", "You Gotta Be My Baby", "Just One More", "Yearning", "Too Much Water" and "Don't Stop the Music", all during 1956 and 1957.

The Big Bopper's hit "Chantilly Lace" was released in 1958, whilst Johnny Preston's "Running Bear", James O'Gwynn's "Talk to Me Lonesome Heart" and Eddie Noack's "Have Blues Will Travel" / "The Price of Love" followed in 1959.

Willie Nelson's first two songwriting hits were "Family Bible", written for Claude Gray, and the 1960 release, "Night Life", recorded by Ray Price.

1960s
The early 1960s saw the beginnings of the psychedelic Texas rock era, particularly with the release of Sir Douglas Quintet's hit song "She's About a Mover", and "Treat Her Right" by Roy Head and The Traits. In January 1968, Quinn approved the leasing of Gold Star masters which were associated with the success behind "Treat Her Right" hitting No. 2 on the Billboard Hot 100 and "She's About A Mover" reaching the No. 13.

The studio continued to attract more psychedelic rock bands including 13th Floor Elevators, Red Krayola, The Bubble Puppy, The Continental Five, The Bad Seeds, The Moving Sidewalks and Zakary Thaks. B.J. Thomas also recorded a portion of his  album, Tomorrow Never Comes, during that time.

Present day
Gold Star Sound Services extended expansion in 1983 following the addition of a specialized recording room, Foam Box Recordings, under the  direction with Joe Hardy and G.L. G-Mane Moon, heading up the production and engineering group. Gold Star Sound Services currently produces state-of-the-art product with online entries, and extreme hi-fidelity sound production innovations.

Legacy
In 1983, Gold Star enjoyed an uplift when the marque, purchased by Billy Gibbons, continued operation under the direction of Willie D Workman.  Workman later partnered to lead the way with the RAD Audio Company, with studio engineers, Andy Bradley and Rodney Meyers.

The association branched out to support the Houston scene, evolving with Destiny's Child, Robert Minot, Ann-Margret, Solange Knowles, Brian McKnight, Twista, Smash Mouth, Beyoncé, Kelly Rowland, Michelle Williams, Hubert Laws, Clay Walker and Calvin Owens.

References

Defunct record labels of the United States
American country music record labels
Record labels established in 1941
Gold Star Records artists